The Embassy of Senegal in Washington, D.C. (French: Ambassade du Sénégal aux Etats Unis) is the diplomatic mission of the Republic of Senegal to the United States. The building is located at 2215 M Street NW. 

The current ambassador of Senegal to the United States is Cheikh Niang.

In addition to the United States, the mission represents Senegal in Barbados, Belize, Grenada, Haiti, Jamaica, Mexico, Panama, and Trinidad and Tobago. In addition the mission serves as the mission to the Institutions of Bretton Woods, the International Monetary Fund and the World Bank.

History
The embassy opened in 1960.

See also
 Senegal-United States relations
 Foreign relations of Senegal
 List of diplomatic missions of Senegal
 List of Washington, D.C. embassies

References

External links

 Ambassade du Sénégal aux Etats Unis (French)
 Embassy of Senegal in Washington, D.C. (Archive, English)
wikimapia

Senegal
Washington, D.C.
Senegal–United States relations